Holes In My Shoes is a documentary feature film. It chronicles the life of Jack Beers, covering 94 years of his life from 1910 to 2004.

Summary
Jack Beers (1910–2009) was known as "New York City's Strongest Boy". Beers eventually became "jack of all trades" - a strongman, a self-taught structural engineer (working on most of NYC's iconic buildings), built Radio City Music Hall, indirectly shortened WW2 through an invention of his, put the spire on the Empire State Building, trained show boxers, and acted in over 200 films.

He grew up in extreme poverty in the Lower East Side of New York City, born in his parents cold water apartment on East 6th Street. His parents were Jewish immigrants from Austria. He sold newspapers on the corner of Avenue B and 10th Street and played in Tompkins Square Park. Beers and his siblings took many jobs as kids to support the starving family. They had potatoes and potato soup every day. They gathered fallen coal from the coal truck to keep the house warm. He had 3 brothers - Manny, Julius and Hy, and one sister, Lilian.

Beers trained from a young boy in Tompkins Square Park. While working for a weight training company, he met one of its board members, Jack Dempsey. He went to Coney Island as a teenager and studied under Warren Lincoln Travis. At 17 he was performing shows in clubs and theaters, most famously at The Lambs Club near Times Square, performing to film stars of the time. He was on the cover of New York City newspapers and was labelled as "New York City's Strongest Boy".

After a fight in a pool hall over an antisemitic remark where his hand was broken, Beers decided to go into the ironwork trade at Fasslers Ironworks in the Lower East Side, near his house. His boss was the Buildings Commissioner of New York City at that time, Sam Fassler. Beers  worked on many NYC's most famous buildings, notably the erection of Rockefeller Center and Radio City Music Hall, where he personally erected the famous marquee and stairs inside.

Beers taught himself to walk the steel beams at great heights. He went on to become a self-taught structural engineer, and became so accomplished that he was asked to be one of the general foreman on the Manhattan Project in Oak Ridge, Tennessee. He worked for Stone & Webster.

In 1950 Beers was responsible for erecting the famous  radio tower spire on top of The Empire State Building, for General Sarnoff and RCA.

In the 1950s, because he couldn't have children with his wife, he put all his energy into training boxers and showed them at the Westminster Dog Shows throughout the 50s.

In the 1960s Beers continued in structural engineering work, participating in the erection of Lincoln Center.

Over his career he worked on NYU, City Hall, The Museum of Modern Art, every Con Edison building, Macy's, Gimbels, George Washington Bridge, The World's Fair, and many more.

In the 1960s Beers decided to audition for a role in George Segal's film Loving. He got the role, acted on the film for 12 days, and proceeded to have minor roles in over 200 films (including 7 Woody Allen films and 5 Arthur Hiller films). His biggest role was in a NYU film school short called "Rosey & Jonesy", directed by David Wachs (director of "Holes In My Shoes"), broadcast on PBS's American Playhouse (1984).

The film "Holes In My Shoes" was made when he was 94. He made a music video of "When You're Smiling" when he was 97.

Jack Beers died just before his 99th birthday of natural causes.

Mayor Bloomberg has recognised him and he has had a day named after him in Oak Ridge, Tennessee.

"Holes In My Shoes", which aired on PBS WNET 13 (New York). 100,000 viewers tuned in December 2009.

Production 
Starring Jack Beers, New York City mayor Michael Bloomberg, Katherine Oliver (NYC Film Commissioner), Arthur Hiller (former Pres of Directors Guild of America), with film clips of Woody Allen and Meryl Streep. Shot in New York City, Greenwich, Connecticut and Oak Ridge, Tennessee. Directed by David Wachs, winner of 20 international film and TV awards.

Post release 
Winner of 4 Best Documentary Feature Film awards.

Aired on PBS WNET 13 (New York) prime time from 2010 to 2009. Distributed on DVD and Online in USA/Canada by KinoLorber. Distributed for TV worldwide by Sky Vision (formerly Parthenon) from the UK.

Broadcasts, Public Performances, Awards & Festivals
 PBS WNET (New York) - aired prime time numerous times - 2009–2011
 In-flight entertainment - British Airways, United Airlines, Thai Airways, Cathay Pacific - 2012
 Winner of Best Feature Documentary - Connecticut Film Festival
 Winner of Best Feature Documentary - Coney Island Film Festival
 Winner of Best Feature Documentary - Secret City Film Festival, Oak Ridge, Tennessee
 Cinequest Film Festival
 Avignon/New York Film Festival
 Declaration of Independence Film Festival (London)

References

External links
 Greenwich Time Article on Jack Beers and film
 New York Times review and film trailer
 DigiNews film review
 
 Official trailer
 
 Company website - LRG Media - http://www.lrgmedia.net
 Company website - A Film For Life - http://www.afilmforlife.com

American documentary films
Documentary films about Jews and Judaism in the United States
Documentary films about New York City
2000s English-language films
2000s American films